Chengguan is a town and the county seat of Lixin County, northwestern Anhui province, East China.

Bozhou
Township-level divisions of Anhui